"Misled" is a 1984 song by American R&B group Kool & the Gang taken from their album, Emergency. The song takes influence from rock and pop music. It reached number 10 on the US Billboard Hot 100. The writing is credited to James Taylor, Ronald Bell, and Kool & the Gang.

Composition
"Misled" is written in the key of E minor (recorded a half-step lower in E minor) with a moderately fast rock tempo of 122 beats per minute. The group's vocals span from B3 to A5 in the song.

Track listing
12" vinyl single

Side A
 "Misled" (Full-Length Version) — 4:59
Side B
 "Ladies' Night" (Remix) — 6:58
 "Rollin'" — 3:10

Charts

Weekly charts

Year-end charts

References

External links
 https://www.discogs.com/Kool-The-Gang-Misled/release/1141278

1984 songs
1985 singles
Kool & the Gang songs
Songs written by Ronald Bell (musician)
Songs written by James "J.T." Taylor
Songs written by Claydes Charles Smith
Songs written by Robert "Kool" Bell
Dance-rock songs
American pop rock songs
De-Lite Records singles